The following is a list of Twisted ToyFare Theatre stories from the magazine ToyFare.

Issues 1 -

Collections

 Parody comics | Comics based on toys | Action figures | American comic strips
Twisted Toyfare Theater stories